Francisco 'Fran' Javier González Muñoz (born 1 February 1989), is a Spanish professional footballer who plays as a defender or defensive midfielder for Terrassa in the Segunda Federación.

Football career
Born in Córdoba, Andalusia, González made his senior debuts in the 2008–09 season with UD Almería B, in Tercera División. In the following seasons he competed in Segunda División B, representing Lucena CF (two stints), Deportivo de La Coruña B and Real Zaragoza B. With the latter he also appeared with the first team on 23 January 2013, starting and being sent off in a 0–4 away loss against Sevilla FC for the season's Copa del Rey.

González signed with another reserve team in August 2013, Córdoba CF B. On 21 July 2014 he moved to Hércules CF, freshly relegated to the third level.
González signed contract with the Polish team Bytovia Bytów  in 21 February 2017.

On 9 July 2018, Hong Kong Premier League club Lee Man announced via Facebook that they had signed Gonzalez.  On 9 August 2018, he was named as the captain of the club, following the departure of Chiu Chun Kit. On 27 April 2019, he scored the winning goal for Lee Man in the Sapling Cup Final against Yuen Long. Lee Man won by 3-2 after extra time capturing the first trophy in club history. 

On 6 July 2019, he announced his contract rescission with Lee Man to join Mohun Bagan. He has been a fans' favourite in Mohun Bagan and was given the name 'Boss' by the Mariners. On 14 February 2020, he scored a hat-trick against NEROCA in the I League. He scored 10 goals for Mohun Bagan, making him the 2nd highest joint goalscorer of 2019-20 I-League along with his fellow teammate, Baba Diawara. With 10 goals and 1 assist in 16 games of the season, he was a vital part of Mohun Bagan's 5th national football league title(2nd I League title) campaign.

On 18 October 2020, González announced his departure from Mohun Bagan. On 2020 October 2020, Bengaluru FC signed González for 2020–21 Indian Super League season. On 1 March 2021, González was released by Bengaluru FC after club’s poor campaign.

In November 2021, he moved to another I-League side Real Kashmir FC and made his debut and scored a goal for the club in a 3–0 win over Indian Arrows at the 2021 IFA Shield. He also scored in the final of the tournament and won the trophy.

Career statistics

Club

Honours

Club
Lee Man
Champions : Hong Kong Sapling Cup: 2018–19
Mohun Bagan
Champions : I-League: 2019–20
Runners–up :  Calcutta Football League: 2019, Durand Cup: 2019
Real Kashmir
Champions : IFA Shield: 2021

References

External links

1989 births
Living people
Footballers from Córdoba, Spain
Spanish footballers
Association football defenders
Segunda División B players
Tercera División players
UD Almería B players
Lucena CF players
Deportivo Fabril players
Real Zaragoza B players
Córdoba CF B players
Hércules CF players
Cypriot First Division players
Ermis Aradippou FC players
Hong Kong Premier League players
Lee Man FC players
Spanish expatriate footballers
Expatriate footballers in Cyprus
Expatriate footballers in Hong Kong
Hong Kong League XI representative players
Bengaluru FC players